Bakr Al-Dulaimi (born 26 April 1998) is an Iraqi swimmer. He competed in the men's 100 metre freestyle event at the 2017 World Aquatics Championships.

References

1998 births
Living people
Iraqi male freestyle swimmers
Place of birth missing (living people)